Sickles Tavern, also known as Hickory Inn, is a historic inn and tavern located near Wayland, Clark County, Missouri. It was built about 1846, and is a two-story, rectangular, vernacular frame dwelling with full basement and attic.  It is an example of a "two-thirds house" - a two-story structure one room wide and two rooms deep, with an end hallway.  During the 19th century, it is believed that the house was a tavern
and stopping place for the mail and passenger coaches passing from Iowa into Kansas and beyond.

It was listed on the National Register of Historic Places in 1979.

References

Houses on the National Register of Historic Places in Missouri
Houses completed in 1846
Buildings and structures in Clark County, Missouri
National Register of Historic Places in Clark County, Missouri